Iptar-Sin or IB.TAR.Sîn (reading uncertain), was the 51st Assyrian king according to the Assyrian King List. He reigned for 12 years some time during the 17th century BC.

Biography

The Assyrian King List provides a sequence of five kings with short reigns purported to be father-son successions, leading Landsberger to suggest that Libaya, Sharma-Adad I and Iptar-Sin may have been brothers of Belu-bani rather than his descendants. The list reports Iptar-Sin as the son of Sharma-Adad I. He is omitted from the list on another fragment. He is called LIK.KUD-Šamaš on the Synchronistic King List which gives his Babylonian counterpart as mDIŠ+U-EN (reading unknown), an unidentified person inserted between the reigns of Gulkišar and his son Pešgaldarameš of the Sealand Dynasty.

He was succeeded by Bazaya, son of Belu-bani.

Inscriptions

Notes

References

17th-century BC Assyrian kings
17th-century BC deaths
Year of birth unknown